La Boisse station (French: Gare de La Boisse) was a French railway station located in commune of La Boisse, Ain department in the Auvergne-Rhône-Alpes region. The station was on the Lyon-Geneva railway.

As of 2020, the station has been closed by the SNCF and lacks any passenger or freight services.

History 

The station was opened along with a section of railway between Lyon-Perrache and Ambérieu, via Saint-Maurice-de-Beynost, on 23 June 1856.

See also 

 List of SNCF stations in Auvergne-Rhône-Alpes

References 

Defunct railway stations in Ain
Lyon–Geneva railway